Lindbergh's grass mouse (Akodon lindberghi) is a rodent species from South America. It is found in Brazil.

References

Akodon
Mammals described in 1990